Charles Stanford may refer to:

 Charles Stanford (minister) (1823–1886), Baptist minister
 Charles Stanford (politician) (1819–1885), New York politician
 Charles Villiers Stanford (1852–1924), Irish composer